Cold Snap is an album by Canadian band Weeping Tile. The band's first major label album, it features a somewhat more rock-oriented sound than the band's debut independent release. The title track and "UFO Rosie" were released as singles.

Track listing
All songs written by Sarah Harmer

 "Poked" – 2:59
 "Cold Snap" – 2:48
 "Pushover" – 2:27
 "UFO Rosie" – 3:46
 "Good Fortune" – 3:44
 "In the Road" – 4:10
 "L'il Interlude" – 0:44
 "The Grin" – 3:39
 "First Lady" – 0:41
 "Joint Account" – 2:43
 "Dolores Haze" – 0:43
 "Westray" – 4:17
 "The Highway" – 4:39
 "Handkerchiefs and Napkins" – 1:44

Personnel
 Sarah Harmer – vocals, guitar, piano, cowbell
 Luther Wright – guitar, backing vocals
 Mary Harmer (credited as "Sister Mary") – bass, backing vocals
 Paul Gurnsey – drums
 John Richardson – drums
 Kevin Fox – cello
 Pauli Ryan – tambourine
 Cam Giroux – percussion
 Robin Aubé – helicopter bass

References

1996 albums
Weeping Tile (band) albums